Acacia cangaiensis is a species of Acacia native to eastern Australia.

Description
The bark is dark brown and smooth or finely fissured. It has terete branchlets with fine white to yellow appressed hairs.

Taxonomy
The species was first formally described by the botanists Mary Tindale and Phillip Kodela in 1991 as part of the work Acacia tesellata, A. cangaiensis and A. dangarensis (Fabaceae, Mimosoideae), three new species from Northern New South Wales, Australia as published in the journal Australian Systematic Botany. It was reclassified as Racosperma cangaiense in 2006 and transferred back into the genus Acacia in 2006. The specific epithet is taken from the Cangai State forest from where the type specimen was collected.

Distribution
The species has a limited distribution in the small area of north eastern New South Wales in the Gibraltar Range National Park to the Nymboida National Park including the Cangai State Forest. It is often part of dry sclerophyll forest communities growing on rocky slopes and ridges in skeletal sandy soils.

See also
 List of Acacia species

References

cangaiensis
Fabales of Australia
Flora of New South Wales
Plants described in 1991